Seku may refer to:

 Seku (given name), a masculine given name
 Seku (surname), a Malian surname